The Faculty of Architecture (abbr: Af) is one of the faculties of the University of Zagreb. It is one of the biggest, and most esteemed schools of architecture in Southeastern Europe, as well as one of the biggest research-and-development institution in the fields of architecture and urban design in Croatia.  The faculty aims to prepare experts to approach complex issues of architecture and urban design. The faculty building, which is located in Kačić-Miošić street in Lower Town in Zagreb, is shared with Facultiy of Civil Engineering and Faculty of Geodesy.

Organisation

The Faculty comprises 4 departments:

Architectural design
Urban planning, physical planning, and landscape architecture
Architectural structures and building construction
Theory and history of architecture

History
Early beginnings of faculty go back to 1919 with foundation of the Royal Technical College in Zagreb with goal of educating professional experts, who previously went to study in Vienna or Prague, both in engineering and scientific fields. Among the six proposed departments was the Department of Architecture and Civil Engineering. In 1926., previously independent college, becomes a part of the University of Zagreb, as a Faculty of Technology. At that time, another school of architecture, led by Drago Ibler was established at the Academy of fine arts. These two institutions are considered to be predecessors of the modern-day Faculty of Architecture. 
The Faculty of Architecture, Civil Engineering and Geodesy was formed on 1 July 1956 when the College of Technology of the University of Zagreb was divided into four new faculties. The faculty existed under this name until 1962 when it was divided in current layout. 
In 1989. the School of design was formed. It is an interdisciplinary programme held  in collaboration with faculties of Forestry,  Economics and Business, Humanities and Social Sciences, Mechanical Engineering and Naval Architecture and the Academy of Fine Arts

Study programmes

Architecture and urban design
The study of architecture and urban design is a five-year-long programme divided into two cycles. 
The Bachelor of Architecture (B.Arch.)(abbr: univ. bacc. ing. arch.) is an undergraduate academic degree awarded to a student after three years of studying. The study ends after two years of graduate programme, when a student becomes Master of Architecture (M.Arch.) (abbr: Mag. ing. arch.).
The study programme is comparable to those by eminent European faculties, especially ETH Zurich, RWTH Aachen, TU Delft and TU Wien.

Interdiciplinary study programme of design
The study programme includes a three-year-long programme of undergraduate study (Bachelor) and a two-year-long programme of graduate study (Master of Design) in the fields of industrial design and visual communications design

Admission into the undergraduate study programme
Entry requirements:
finished four-year high school
passed state exam (Državna Matura), extended levels in all compulsory subjects are required
passed classification procedure (three tests, covering visual and graphic abilities, spatial perception and general knowledge)

Notable professors
Viktor Kovačić
Drago Ibler (at the Academy of Fine Arts, School of Architecture)
Velimir Neidhardt

Notable alumni
Vjenceslav Richter
Alfred Albini
Radimir Čačić (former vice president of the Government of Croatia)
Marina Matulović-Dropulić (former mayor of Zagreb)
Aleksandar Ljahnicky 
3LHD

External links
  Homepage

Educational institutions established in 1919
Architecture
Engineering universities and colleges in Croatia
1919 establishments in Yugoslavia